Jalan Kulim Hi-Tech, Federal Route 3053, also known as Perdana Highway (Lebuhraya Perdana), is a major highway in Kedah, Malaysia.

The Kilometre Zero is located at Kulim Hi-Tech junctions of the Butterworth–Kulim Expressway.

At most sections, the Federal Route 3053 was built under the JKR R5 road standard, with a speed limit of 90 km/h.

List of interchanges

References

Highways in Malaysia
Malaysian Federal Roads